Muhammad Kashif  is a Pakistani politician who was a member of the Provincial Assembly of the Punjab from May 2013 to May 2018 and from August 2018 to January 2023.

Early life and education
He was born on 27 January 1976 in Sheikhupura.

He has the degree of Bachelor of Science (Hons) in Economics which he obtained in 2000 from London School of Economics and Political Science and the degree of Master of Science in Economic Development and Planning which he received in 2006 from University College London.

Political career

He was elected to the Provincial Assembly of the Punjab as a candidate of Pakistan Muslim League (Nawaz) (PML-N) from Constituency PP-173 (Nankana Sahib-IV) in 2013 Pakistani general election.

He was re-elected to Provincial Assembly of the Punjab as a candidate of PML-N from Constituency PP-133 (Nankana Sahib-III) in 2018 Pakistani general election.

References

Living people
1976 births
Pakistan Muslim League (N) MPAs (Punjab)
Punjab MPAs 2013–2018
Alumni of the London School of Economics
Alumni of University College London
Punjab MPAs 2018–2023